Focused is a 1999 studio album by jazz fusion drummer Billy Cobham.

Track listing
"Mirage" (Billy Cobham) – 10:43
"The Sleaze Factor" (Randy Brecker) – 7:11
"Walking In 5" (Billy Cobham) – 9:51
"How Was The Night?" (Stefan Rademacher) – 8:06
"Three Will Get You Four" (Billy Cobham) – 11:39
"Nothing Can Hurt Her Now" (Carl Orr) – 11:00
"Disfigured Mirrors" (Billy Cobham) – 7:22
"Avatar"(Gary Husband) – 6:46

Personnel
 Billy Cobham – drums, percussion
 Randy Brecker – trumpet, flugelhorn
 Gary Husband – keyboards
 Carl Orr – guitars
 Stefan Rademacher – electric bass

Other credits
 Tristan Powell – engineer

References

1999 albums
Billy Cobham albums